"Something Anything" is the second single taken from Indie band Travis' sixth studio album Ode To J. Smith. The single peaked at #113 on the UK Singles Chart.

Background
The single was released on 15 September 2008. It is the first Travis single not to be written by singer Fran Healy, as bassist Dougie Payne is credited to having co-written the song. It was the only song on the album not to be written during a 5-week album sessions writing period, and was instead written months later. Payne also wrote the B-side, "Tail of the Tiger". The artwork of the single shows a heart, with a hole in either side, representing the main song and two b-sides, as confirmed by singer Fran Healy.

Track listing
 CD Single
 "Something Anything" - 2:22
 "Tail Of The Tiger" - 2:49
 "Used To Belong" - 3:26

 7" Vinyl
 "Something Anything" - 2:22
 "Lola" - 4:09

Charts

References

2008 singles
Songs written by Dougie Payne
Songs written by Fran Healy (musician)
2008 songs